Blank Dogs is an American post-punk project from Brooklyn. It is a monicker for multi-instrumentalist Mike Sniper, who had previously played with DC Snipers.

Releases
Blank Dogs' first releases arrived in 2007. By 2008, it had issued around hundred releases in 2008, in various formats. Among them was an anthology on Troubleman Unlimited Records. Blank Dogs signed with In the Red Records and 2009, and released the full-length Under and Under as a CD and double LP. (The latter pressing had bonus tracks). Crystal Stilts and Vivian Girls guest on the album.

Discography

Albums
On Two Sides (cassette, Fuck It Tapes / LP, Troubleman Unlimited / CD, Sacred Bones, 2008)
Under and Under (LPx2, CD, In the Red Records, 2009)
Land and Fixed (LP, Captured Tracks, 2010)

EPs
The First Two Weeks (12" Freedom School, 2007)
Yellow Mice Sleep (7" HoZac, 2007)
Diana (the Herald) (12" Sacred Bones, 2007)
The Fields (12" Woodsist / cassette, Fuck It Tapes / CD Woodist, 2008)
Mirror Lights (cassette, Drone Erant, 2009)
Captured Tracks Vol. 1 (CD-R, Captured Tracks, 2008) 
Seconds (Captured Tracks, 2009)

Singles
The Doorbell Fire (7", Sweet Rot, 2007/2008)
Two Months (7", Florida's Dying, 2007)
Stuck Inside The World (7", Daggerman, 2008)
Setting Fire To Your House (7", 4:2:2, 2008)
In Here (Slow Room/Anywhere) (7", Down In The Ground, (Captured Tracks), 2008/2009)
Waiting (7", In The Red Records, 2009)
Leaves (cassette, Captured Tracks, 2010)
BDMS (7", Disordered, 2015)

Compilations
Blank Box (LP, ?, 2008)
Year One  (cassette, Fuck It Tapes / LP, CD, Sacred Bones, 2008/2009)
 Ages Ago on The World's Lousy With Ideas Vol. 8 (Almost Ready Records, 2009)Collected By Itself: 2006-2009 (2xLP/CD, Captured Tracks, 2011)

References
Footnotes

Further reading
Band to Watch: Blank Dogs. Stereogum, September 5, 2008.
Hype Monitor: Blank Dogs, Bowerbirds, Brilliant Colors. Rolling Stone, May 14, 2009.
Blank Dogs. East Bay Express'', June 17, 2009.
Review, Pitchfork Media
The Official Blank Dogs Fan Community Website
Land and Fixed Review SPIN

Indie rock musical groups from New York (state)
Musical groups from Brooklyn
In the Red artists
Captured Tracks artists